The Aldershot Division Open  Lawn Tennis Tournament was a late Victorian era men's grass court founded in 1879. The tournament ran until 1885 before it was discontinued.

History
The Aldershot Division Open Tournament were established in 1879. The tournament was staged at the Aldershot Divisional LTC, Aldershot Garrison, Hampshire, England. This military sports tournament organised by the Aldershot Division of the British Army was a open competition for serving officers of the division, and civilian amateur tennis players. The tournament ran for just seven editions before it was abolished in 1885.

Mens Singles

References

Grass court tennis tournaments
Defunct tennis tournaments in the United Kingdom